Mesogondolella is an extinct genus of conodonts.

The species M. daheshenensis and M. subgracilis are from the Permian (probably Wordian) of the Daheshen Formation in China.

The top of the Sakmarian stage (the base of the Artinskian) is defined as the place in the stratigraphic record where fossils of conodont species Sweetognathus whitei and Mesogondolella bisselli first appear.

References

External links 

 

Ozarkodinida genera
Permian conodonts